Girolamo Troppa (1637–1710) was an Italian painter of the Baroque period, depicting mainly sacred subjects.

He was active in Rome and Umbria. He was a follower of Carlo Maratti. He painted for the church of San Giacomo delle Penitenti, in competition with the son of Giovan Francesco Romanelli. Works attributed to Troppa are also found in Cesi, Narni, and Terni. He painted for the church of San Salvatore and the Oratory of San Sebastiano in his native Rocchette, and for the church of San Niccolò (1700) in San Torri in Sabina. He died in 1710.

His works include:
The Conception after Castelli.
Emperor Julian after one of the artists named Pomarancio.
Portrait of Louis XIV.

References

External links

1637 births
1710 deaths
17th-century Italian painters
Italian male painters
18th-century Italian painters
Italian Baroque painters
Umbrian painters
18th-century Italian male artists